Eclipse was a Seattle dog that took herself to a Seattle dog park via King County Metro bus beginning in 2015.

The first time the dog took the bus alone was an accident when she boarded without her owner, who caught up with her on the next bus. He decided to let her ride to the park without him afterwards. Eclipse was required to pay her bus fare like any dog on Metro Transit not held in the lap, and had an ORCA card tied to her collar for payment.

The dog is the subject of a 2016 book,  and a rap music video.

On October 15, 2022, Eclipse died at the age of 10. Two days before, she was diagnosed with cancer.

Sources

References

Further reading

Nightline January 2015
Huffington Post 2017
Hindustan Times 2020
CBC via AP 2015
BBC News 2015

Individual dogs in the United States
Culture of Seattle